Ushakovo is a rural locality (a village) in Nikolayevsky Selsoviet, Ufimsky District, Bashkortostan, Russia. The population was 118 as of 2010. There are 10 streets.

Geography 
Ushakovo is located 24 km northwest of Ufa (the district's administrative centre) by road. Yagodnaya Polyana is the nearest rural locality.

References 

Rural localities in Ufimsky District